Kabatiella berberidis is a species of fungus belonging to the family Saccotheciaceae.

References

Dothideales